The First League of Zagreb ( or ) is a football county league in Croatia. It usually consists of 16 teams.

Previous teams 

 Concordia
 Prečko
 Ivanja Reka 
 Sesvetski Kraljevec
 Špansko
 Odra
 Sava (Z)
 Nur 
 Croatia Prigorje
 Mladost - Buzin
 ZET
 Botinec
 Ponikve
 Sloga-Gredelj
 Šparta-Elektra
 Dinamo 00

5
Sport in Zagreb
Croa